Jagadish Debbarma is an Indian politician and current chairman of the Tripura Tribal Areas Autonomous District Council (TTAADC).

Career 
Debbarmaran ran for MDC in the 2021 TTAADC election which was held on 6 April 2021. His party the Indigenous Nationalist Party of Twipra (INPT) forged an alliance with TIPRA Motha and contested on 5 seats. Jagadish won the Jirania Constituency seat and became a member of the District Council.

On 19 April 2021, at the oath-taking ceremony Jagadish Debbarma was unanimously elected and announced as the Chairman of the TTAADC. This is second time that he will be assuming office as the Chairman of the newly formed Council.

References 

Indian politicians

1960 births
Living people